The basketball of Sportovní klub Královo Pole Brno won the top league in total once and include it in the record of the Czechoslovak league overall 15th place.

Honours 
Czechoslovak League
 Winners (1): 1938-39

External links 
 Official site

Basketball teams in the Czech Republic
Sport in Brno
Basketball in Czechoslovakia